Spéracèdes is a commune in the Alpes-Maritimes department in southeastern France.

Population
Residents are called "Spéracèdois".

See also
Communes of the Alpes-Maritimes department

References

External links
Commune's official website
Commune's events, life, and news : "Spéracèdes Demain" association's website

Communes of Alpes-Maritimes
Alpes-Maritimes communes articles needing translation from French Wikipedia